Keenan Clayton (born June 19, 1987) is a former American football linebacker. He was drafted by the Philadelphia Eagles in the fourth round of the 2010 NFL Draft. He played college football at Oklahoma.

Professional career

Philadelphia Eagles
Clayton was selected by the Philadelphia Eagles in the fourth round (121st overall) of the 2010 NFL Draft. He was signed to a four-year contract on June 10, 2010. He was released August 31, 2012.

Oakland Raiders
On September 1, 2012, Clayton was signed by the Oakland Raiders. On August 25, 2013, he was waived by the Raiders.

Arizona cardinals
On May 14, 2014, the Arizona Cardinals signed Clayton to a one-year contract. The Cardinals released Clayton on August 25, 2014.

Toronto Argonauts
On October 7, 2014, Clayton signed with the Toronto Argonauts of the Canadian Football League. He was released by the Argonauts on October 21, 2014.

References

External links

Oakland Raiders bio
Philadelphia Eagles bio
Oklahoma Sooners bio
NFL Combine

Living people
1987 births
People from Sulphur Springs, Texas
Players of American football from Texas
American football linebackers
Oklahoma Sooners football players
Philadelphia Eagles players
Oakland Raiders players
Arizona Cardinals players